Live is a 1994 album by Michael Nyman and the Michael Nyman Band.  It is Nyman's 24th release and the fifteenth with the Band.  It is the first commercial live album by the band, which had previously performed live on the magazine release, 'The Masterwork' Award Winning Fish-Knife.  It is also known as "The Upside-Down Violin", the only new composition on the album, and the working title, Breaking the Rules, made it into many computer sales systems.  The album's cover and booklet were designed by Dave McKean.  Liner notes are by David Toop.  Early printings of the album cover listed the first three tracks erroneously as "Queen of the Night", "An Eye for Optical Theory", and "Chasing Sheep Is Best Left to Shepherds"

Track listing
"In Re Don Giovanni"
"Bird List"
"Queen of the Night"
"Dipping"
"Stroking"
"Slow"
"Faster"
"Faster Still"
"To the Edge of the Earth"
"The Promise/The Heart Asks Pleasure First"
"Here To There"
"Lost & Found"
"The Embrace"
"All Imperfect Things"
"Dreams of A Journey"
"Here To There (Encore)"

Personnel
Musicians from the Michael Nyman Band
Michael Nyman, piano
Jonathan Carney, violin
Bill Hawkes, violin
Catherine Musker, viola
Tony Hinnigan, cello
John Harle, soprano/alto saxophones
David Roach, soprano/alto saxophones
Andrew Findon, flute/piccolo/baritone saxophone
Nigel Barr, trombone/tuba/euphonium
Martin Elliott, bass guitar
Extra musicians on tracks from The Piano
Guergui Stoianov Boiadjev (violin)
Nanko Mikov Dimitrov (violin)
Evelina Nedeva Arabadjieva (violin)
Kantcho Stefanov Kantchev (violin)
Nediltcho Suilianov Hristov (viola)
Stefan Todorov Jilkov (viola)
Marieta Mihaylova Ivanova (cello)
Emilia Hrostova Radilova (cello)
Musicians from Orquesta Andaluzi de Tetouan on Upside-Down Violin
Abdessadeq Cheqara (violin)
Abdella Chekara (laud)
Jelloul Najidi (kanoun)
Ahmed Taoud (violin)
Driss Aaufi (saxophone)
Ahmet Mrabet (clarinet)
Abdesslam Beniisa (cello)
Mohamed Achaalh (banderita (tambourine))
Jalla Chekara (violin)
Nour-Din Aghbal (violin)
Abdelouahid El Bazi (derboliga (drum))
Mohammed Chkara (cello)
Manager of Orquesta Andaluzi de Tetouan:  Mehdi Emrane
conducted by Michael Nyman
composed, arranged, and directed by Michael Nyman
produced by Michael Nyman and Michael J. Dutton
engineer: Michael J. Dutton
assistant engineer: Will Shapland
Recorded with Manor Mobile Recording Studio at Paraninfo de la Universidad, Albacete on 14 May 1994 and Teatro Monumental, Madrid on 15 May 1994.
Mixed at Kitsch Studios, Brussels
Edited at Transfermation, London
artist representative for Michael Nyman: Nigel Barr
design, illustration, and photography by Dave McKean @ Hourglass
Live and portrait photography by Lester Po Fun Lee

References

1994 live albums
Michael Nyman live albums